David Herlihy (May 8, 1930 – February 15, 1991) was an American historian who wrote on medieval and renaissance life. He was married to historian Patricia Herlihy; one of their sons is the historian of bicycles, David V. Herlihy. Topics of his included domestic life, especially the roles of women, and the changing structure of the family. He studied for his bachelor's degree at the University of San Francisco, received a doctoral degree from Yale University and taught at Bryn Mawr College, the University of Wisconsin, Harvard and Brown.

His study of the Florentine and Pistoiese Catasto of 1427 is one of the first statistical surveys to use computers to analyze large amounts of data. The resulting book examines statistical patterns in tax-collecting surveys to find indications of social trends.

The University of San Francisco history department named their annual award for the best student-written history paper the David Herlihy Prize, and Brown University has established a David Herlihy University Professorship.

Life 
David Joseph Herlihy was born the youngest of four in San Francisco in 1930 to Irishman Maurice Herlihy, of County Kerry, and Irish American Irene O'Connor. His parents had eloped in Los Gatos in California. He was a member of the school debating team and met his wife-to-be Patricia McGahey at a match as a sophomore.

At college, he published his first article in the journal of the American Catholic Historical Society of Philadelphia. It was about Peter Yorke and the American Protective Association. He got his bachelor's degree with all As in three years from the University of San Francisco. Herb Caen reported this achievement at the time. He studied Byzantine history at the Catholic University of America. He received his master's degree in 1953. He went on to undertake a fellowship at Yale, where he worked on the Middle Ages in Italy with Robert Lopez.

He had his first son, Maurice, before bringing his young family to Pisa for a year between 1954 and 1955 (courtesy of the Fulbright Program). Bryn Mawr hired him in 1955; he was to work there for the next nine years. In the meanwhile, he wrote a dissertation on Pisa, for which Yale awarded him a doctoral degree in 1956. This effort was the groundwork for his first book, published by Yale in 1958, Pisa in the Early Renaissance. The Guggenheim sent him to Florence for a year between 1961 and 1962. His wife was also in Florence that year, with a grant of her own from the Fulbright Association. The city flooded during their stay.

From 1964 to 1972, he was on the faculty of the University of Wisconsin and earned tenure there. Herlihy's next trip to Florence was 1966–1967, as fellow of the American Council of Learned Societies. He produced his second book (on Pistoia) shortly after. He was a member of both the American Philosophical Society and the American Academy of Arts and Sciences.

Quotes

Bibliography 
 Pisa In The Early Renaissance; A Study Of Urban Growth, 1958
 Medieval And Renaissance Pistoia; The Social History Of An Italian Town, 1200–1430, 1967
 Medieval Culture and Society, 1968 (compiler)
 The History of Feudalism, 1970 (compiler)
 Women in Medieval Society, 1971
 The Social History Of Italy And Western Europe, 700–1500, 1978
 Les Toscans Et Leurs Familles : Une étude Du "Catasto" Florentin De 1427, 1979 (with Christiane Klapisch-Zuber)
 Cities And Society In Medieval Italy, 1980
 Medieval Households, 1985
 Tuscans and their Families, 1985
 Opera Muliebria : Women And Work In Medieval Europe, 1990
The Black Death and the Transformation of the West, 1997 (posthumous, edited by Samuel Cohn)

References

External links
 

1930 births
1991 deaths
University of San Francisco alumni
Yale University alumni
Bryn Mawr College faculty
University of Wisconsin–Madison faculty
Harvard University faculty
Brown University faculty
Presidents of the American Historical Association
20th-century American historians
American male non-fiction writers
Fellows of the Medieval Academy of America
20th-century American male writers
Members of the American Philosophical Society